Ditchley is a historic plantation house located near Kilmarnock, Northumberland County, Virginia.  It was built in 1762, and is a two-story, Georgian style brick mansion with a hipped roof. It consists of a five bay main block flanked by one-story wings.  The house was renovated and modernized in the 1930s by noted philanthropist Jessie Ball duPont (1884-1970).  Also on the property are two contributing smokehouses and the Lee family cemetery and site of a kitchen building.

Original built in 1687. This plantation was a grant to Col. Richard Lee I and was named for a Lee estate near Oxford, England. House was built by Kendall Lee, grandson of Richard Lee and son of Captain Hancock Lee, Hon. (1653–1709) and Mary Kendall (1661–1694).

It was listed on the National Register of Historic Places in 1992.

References

External links
Ditchley, State Route 607, Ditchley, Northumberland County, VA 19 photos and 3 data pages at Historic American Buildings Survey

Historic American Buildings Survey in Virginia
Lee family residences
Plantation houses in Virginia
Houses on the National Register of Historic Places in Virginia
Georgian architecture in Virginia
Houses completed in 1762
Houses in Northumberland County, Virginia
National Register of Historic Places in Northumberland County, Virginia